Peter Erzberger (born 3 September 1941) is a Brazilian former Olympic sailor in the Star class. He competed in the 1980 Summer Olympics together with Eduardo de Souza, where they finished 9th.

References

Living people
Olympic sailors of Brazil
Brazilian male sailors (sport)
Star class sailors
Sailors at the 1980 Summer Olympics – Star
1941 births
Place of birth missing (living people)